Liu Wen-hsiung (8 September 1954 – 31 July 2017) was a Taiwanese politician who served in the Legislative Yuan from 1999 to 2008.

Early life and education
Liu was born in Keelung in 1954, and was of Mainland Chinese descent. He attended National Chengchi University before completing graduate work at National Taiwan Ocean University.

Political career
Liu served two terms on the Taiwan Provincial Council before his 1998 election to the Legislative Yuan. The Kuomintang formally began expulsion proceedings against Liu in December 1999, because he supported the 2000 independent presidential campaign of James Soong. Liu later joined Soong's People First Party, and was the PFP's legislative whip. On 3 December 2005, he joined the Republic of China local election for the Keelung City mayoralty. However, he finished in third place.

In 2006, Liu accused Kuo Yao-chi, then the Minister of Transportation and Communications, of appointing Wu Cheng-chih, a friend who was recommended by her husband, to the secretary-general position of the China Aviation Development Foundation as a form of nepotism; Liu said that Weng did not have the proper aviation background. Kuo said that she did not practice nepotism and that she would seek to have action taken against Liu. The next year, Liu ran in the Keelung mayoral by-election and was a reported candidate for the Control Yuan. Liu later became deputy secretary-general of the People First Party. Liu ran in the 2016 legislative elections as a representative of Keelung district, but lost.

 

 
 
 
 
 
 
 
 

In 2017, he was formally nominated to a seat on the Control Yuan.

Personal life
Liu was a Taiwanese Muslim. He suffered a heart attack in July 2017, which led to a coma. He was moved to Chang Gung Memorial Hospital in Keelung on 21 July, where he died on 31 July 2017, aged 62. His body was sent to Taipei Grand Mosque where funeral prayer was performed before he was buried.

References

External links 

 

1954 births
2017 deaths
Taiwanese Muslims
Taiwanese people of Hui descent
People First Party Members of the Legislative Yuan
National Taiwan Ocean University alumni
Disease-related deaths in Taiwan
Keelung Members of the Legislative Yuan
Members of the 4th Legislative Yuan
Members of the 5th Legislative Yuan
Members of the 6th Legislative Yuan
Kuomintang Members of the Legislative Yuan in Taiwan
National Chengchi University alumni
Party List Members of the Legislative Yuan